This is a list of electoral results for the Electoral district of North Perth in Western Australian state elections.

Members for North Perth

Election results

Elections in the 1950s

Elections in the 1940s

Elections in the 1930s

Elections in the 1920s

Elections in the 1910s

 Smith's designation at the 1914 election was simply "Liberal", rather than "National Liberal".

|- style="background-color:#E9E9E9"
! colspan="6" style="text-align:left;" |After distribution of preferences

 Preferences were not distributed to completion.

 Preferences were not distributed.

Elections in the 1900s

Elections in the 1890s

References

Western Australian state electoral results by district